Hong Seok-cheon (born February 3, 1971) is a South Korean actor, television personality, restaurateur and member of the dissolved Democratic Labor Party. He caused considerable controversy in his home country when he came out as gay in 2000, and remains the most prominent openly gay celebrity in Korea.

Career 
Hong Seok-cheon was born in Cheongyang County in South Chungcheong Province. He began his entertainment career as a male model, and made his screen debut in 1994 as a reporter for Live TV Information Center. In 1995, he won the bronze prize at the KBS Comedian Festival (for college students). Due to his versatility and comic timing, Hong went on to a prolific career on South Korean television, appearing in children's programs and variety shows, as well as sitcoms and dramas.

In 2000, Hong was asked a question regarding his sexuality on a variety show, and he chose to answer honestly that he was gay. Though the show's producers initially edited out the exchange, a journalist got wind of the story and pressed Hong to confirm his admission. After Hong revealed his homosexuality, he was fired from his network television programs and advertisements amidst public uproar, and no longer landed any major acting roles. He faced massive stigma after becoming the country's first openly gay celebrity, and later said he experienced shunning, verbal abuse and discrimination that he rarely stepped out of his social circle. He then wrote his memoir My Heart Still Throbs for Forgotten Love, in which he recounted his failed romance with a Dutch man named Tony.

Forced out of the entertainment business, Hong wanted to leave the country to study in New York, but he said he decided stay in Korea to prove to his detractors that he could be a success. He started his first restaurant Our Place in 2002, two years after he came out. He now owns and runs nine high-end restaurants in Itaewon, home to a large expat community in Seoul. Hong's restaurants are all characterized by the prefix "My," namely: My Hong, My Chi chi*s, My Thai, My Thai China, My X, My Chelsea, My Noodle, and My Suji.

In 2004, he joined the Democratic Labor Party and was selected by Time magazine as the year's Asian Hero. Hong also continued appearing regularly on talk shows, notably Yeo Yoo Man Man, on which he guested with his parents and discussed his life since coming out. Acting-wise, Hong starred in the thriller Puzzle (2006) and the stage play A Midsummer Night's Dream (2009). He also founded the internet shopping mall Ne2Nom in 2007, and became a professor at Korea National University of Arts (teaching Broadcast Content Production in 2010 and Fashion Arts in 2011).

After his sister's divorce, Hong adopted her two children and changed their last names to his. In 2008, he hosted his own talk show Coming Out, which featured gay issues. Despite Korean society's continuing conservatism, Hong overcame initial public disapproval and gradually gained more mainstream acceptance, especially among the younger generation, in part because of his activism in fighting for LGBT rights. From bit parts and cameos, he now emcees shows on cable television and has a sizeable following on social media.

In 2015, Hong announced that he plans to run for district head of the Yongsan District Office in the 2018 local elections. Having lived in Yongsan District for ten years, he said he aims to promote cultural spaces for young artists and small businesses, while providing welfare for sexual minorities. If elected, he will become the first openly gay person to become a publicly elected official in Korea. In 2016, he participated in the program Law Of The Jungle.

In 2018, he revealed that he is third cousins with Taeyong of NCT.

Filmography

Television  shows

Web shows

Television series

Web series

Films

Theater

Books

References

External links 
 
 
 
 

1971 births
Living people
South Korean male television actors
South Korean male film actors
South Korean male musical theatre actors
South Korean male stage actors
South Korean male models
South Korean gay actors
South Korean LGBT rights activists
Hanyang University alumni
Gay politicians